The 2003–04 season was the 105th season in the existence of Olympique Lyonnais and the club's 15th consecutive season in the top flight of French football. They participated in the Ligue 1, the Coupe de France, the Coupe de la Ligue, the Trophée des Champions and UEFA Champions League.

First-team squad
Squad at end of season

Left club during season

Competitions

Overview

Trophée des Champions

Ligue 1

League table

Results summary

Results by round

Matches

Coupe de France

Coupe de la Ligue

UEFA Champions League

Group stage

Knockout stage

References

Olympique Lyonnais seasons
Lyon
French football championship-winning seasons